Geni e o Zepelim (English: Jenny and the Zeppelin) is a Brazilian MPB song, composed and recorded by Chico Buarque for his 1978 album "Ópera do Malandro", something to the effect of "Street Smart Opera", or "Smooth Hustler Opera", though Malandro is a culture-specific icon, the soundtrack to the eponymous musical play, in which the song's plot is set; it is also part of its soundtrack. A film adaptation was released in 1986.

The song has become relevant enough that the refrain "joga pedra na Geni [casta a stone at Jenny!,figuratively, casting aspersions upon someone or /Throw a stone at Jenny!/, literally meaning to physically harm a woman who helps the poor and the oppressed through her warmth and willingness to share her body]" has been referenced in situations where people are victims of moral persecution.

Summary of the lyrics 

The lyrics are hepta-syllabic rhyming verses with strict meter, and are about Geni, a prostitute who was excluded and discriminated against by the "decent and moral" citizenry. When a zeppelin arrives at the town and the commander threatens to attack and destroy the city, unless Geni agrees to sleep with him and satisfy all his needs. As a natural-born saint, who dedicated her life to helping the excluded, the abandoned, the oppressed, she states she'd rather sleep with beasts. The "decent and moral" citizens and city leaders now see she's endowed with power over their lives, a wave of mounting pressure falls upon her, culminating with "the mayor, on his knees/ the priest, with teary eyes/ and the bankers, with a million bucks: Go with him, please, Jenny!..." Reluctantly, she agrees to, in spite of her disgust. Now she's the hero of the town, a saint, a savior, as crowds sing in her praise. To Jenny, a nightmarish round of disgusting debauchery ensues, having to surrender her body and soul to a man she feels repulsion towards. The population treats Geni in a positive light while the commander's request in being fulfilled. As soon as the day breaks and he goes away, Jenny wakes up at the sound of crowds chanting the same punishing, hateful lines of the beginning, now encouraging people not only to throw stones, but "shit" at Jenny. The discrimination and persecution resumes. Business as usual in a bourgeoise society.

Inspiration 
Some sources suggest Geni could have been inspired by the homonymous character from Nelson Rodrigues's 1965 play Toda Nudez Será Castigada.

Meaning 
Various sources believe the song to be critical of colonialism, imperialism and capitalism, and that Geni is a personification of the oppressed groups and peoples.

João Marcos Mateus Kogawa, of Revista Urutágua wrote about "Geni e o Zepelim":
Geni symbolizes silence, submission and non-voice, in the context of a system which prevents her from talking. Nevertheless, her other subject talks through the voice of the author, who portrays her as a martyr or heroine, who attacks her inquisitors' values.

Cover versions  
Several artists have covered the song:
 Célia Rabelo
 Cida Moreira
 Elba Ramalho
 Letícia Sabatella
 Maria Eugênia

References

External links 
 Official Chico Buarque site
 Original recording by Chico Buarque published in 1979 (Apple Music)
 Official Live performance by Chico Buarque in 2012 (Youtube)
 Live Performance by Leticia Sabatella in 2011 (Youtube)

Brazilian music
1978 songs